Lydus or Lydos is an adjective or a name based on the adjective for a person or other object from ancient Lydia. It can mean:

 Lydus, third king of Maeonia in succession to his father Atys
 Lydos, 6th century BC vase painter
 Lydus, John the Lydian, a 6th-century AD Byzantine administrator
 Lydus, a genus of blister beetle

See also
 Lud (disambiguation)